RAF Kingsnorth may refer to one of two separate military airfields in Kent, which were located at two different places in Kent and operated in two distinct periods.

 RNAS Kingsnorth,  (1918-24) formerly RNAS Kingsnorth (1914-1918) on the Isle of Grain
 RAF Kingsnorth (World War II), (1943-45) at Kingsnorth near Ashford, Kent